Domenico Maria Viani (1668–1711) was an Italian painter of the Baroque period.

Biography

He was born in Bologna, the son of Giovanni Maria Viani, and was educated there under his father, who kept a rival academy to that of Carlo Cignani. For the church of La Natività at Bologna, there is a series of Prophets and Evangelists by him; for the church of Santo Spirito, Bergamo, he painted a Miracle of St Antony of Padua.  He disappeared in Pistoia where he is also thought to have died.

References

External links

1668 births
1711 deaths
17th-century Italian painters
Italian male painters
18th-century Italian painters
Italian Baroque painters
Painters from Bologna
18th-century Italian male artists